Roby Andika (born 26 January 1999) is an Indonesian professional footballer who plays as a midfielder.

Club career

Muba Babel United
He was signed for Muba Babel United to play in Liga 2 in the 2020 season.

References

External links
 Roby Andika at Liga Indonesia
 Roby Andika at Soccerway

Living people
1999 births
Indonesian footballers
Liga 2 (Indonesia) players
Muba Babel United F.C. players
Sriwijaya F.C. players
Association football midfielders
People from Palembang